Polacca Airport  is a public use airport in Navajo County, Arizona, United States. The airport is owned by the Hopi Tribe.

This airport is included in the National Plan of Integrated Airport Systems for 2011–2015, which categorized it as a general aviation facility.

Facilities and aircraft 
It has one runway designated 4/22 with an asphalt surface measuring 4,200 by 50 feet (1,280 x 15 m).

For the 12-month period ending April 17, 2010, the airport had 200 general aviation aircraft operations, an average of 16 per month.  Anyone can utilize the airport for business or personal purposes.  Today, most customers are from the U.S. Health and Human Services' Indian Health Service.

Charles Loloma, a famous Hopi artist, often parked his private plane at the airport.

See also 
 List of airports in Arizona

References

External links 
 Polacca Airport (P10) at Arizona DOT airport directory
 Aerial image as of June 1997 from USGS The National Map
 

Airports in Navajo County, Arizona
Native American airports